Apotomis is a genus of moths belonging to the subfamily Olethreutinae of the family Tortricidae.

Species

Apotomis afficticia Heinrich, 1926
Apotomis albeolana (Zeller, 1875)
Apotomis algidana Krogerus, 1945
Apotomis apateticana (McDunnough, 1922)
Apotomis basipunctana (Walsingham, 1900)
Apotomis betuletana (Haworth, [1811])
Apotomis biemina Kawabe, 1980
Apotomis bifida (McDunnough, 1938)
Apotomis brevicornutana (McDunnough, 1938)
Apotomis capreana (Hubner, [1817])
Apotomis coloradensis Adamski in Adamski & Peters, 1986
Apotomis cuphostra (Butler, 1879)
Apotomis davisi Kawabe, 1993
Apotomis deceptana (Kearfott, 1905)
Apotomis demissana (Kennel, 1901)
Apotomis flavifasciana (Kawabe, 1976)
Apotomis formalis (Meyrick, in Caradja & Meyrick, 1935)
Apotomis fraterculana Krogerus, 1945
Apotomis frigidana (Packard, 1866)
Apotomis funerea (Meyrick, 1920)
Apotomis fuscomaculata Kawabe, 1993
Apotomis geminata (Walsingham, 1900)
Apotomis generosa (Meyrick, 1909)
Apotomis infida (Heinrich, 1926)
Apotomis inundana ([Denis & Schiffermuller], 1775)
Apotomis jucundana Kawabe, 1984
Apotomis kazarmana Falkovitsh, 1966
Apotomis kusunokii Kawabe, 1993
Apotomis lacteifacies (Walsingham, 1900)
Apotomis lemniscatana (Kennel, 1901)
Apotomis lineana ([Denis & Schiffermuller], 1775)
Apotomis lutosana (Kennel, 1901)
Apotomis moestana (Wocke, 1862)
Apotomis monotona (Kuznetzov, 1962)
Apotomis paludicolana (Brower, 1953)
Apotomis platycremna (Meyrick, in Caradja & Meyrick, 1935)
Apotomis removana (Kearfott, 1907)
Apotomis sauciana (Frolich, 1828)
Apotomis semifasciana (Haworth, [1811])
Apotomis sororculana (Zetterstedt, 1839)
Apotomis spinulana (McDunnough, 1938)
Apotomis spiraeana (Kuznetzov, in Danilevsky, Kuznetsov & Falkovitsh, 1962)
Apotomis spurinfida Adamski in Adamski & Peters, 1986
Apotomis stagnana Kuznetzov, 1962
Apotomis tertiana (McDunnough, 1922)
Apotomis trifida Adamski in Adamski & Peters, 1986
Apotomis trigonias Diakonoff, 1973
Apotomis turbidana Hubner, [1825]
Apotomis vaccinii Kuznetzov, 1969
Apotomis vigens Falkovitsh, 1966

See also
 List of Tortricidae genera

References

External links
 
 Tortricidae.com

Olethreutini
Tortricidae genera
Taxa named by Jacob Hübner